The 2022 Bretagne Classic Ouest–France was a road cycling one-day race that took place on 28 August 2021 in the region of Brittany in northwestern France. It was the 86th edition of the Bretagne Classic Ouest–France and the 28th event of the 2022 UCI World Tour. It was won by Wout van Aert in a group sprint.

Teams 
All eighteen UCI WorldTeams and six UCI ProTeams made up the twenty-four teams that participated in the race.

UCI WorldTeams

 
 
 
 
 
 
 
 
 
 
 
 
 
 
 
 
 
 

UCI ProTeams

Result

References

External links 

Bretagne Classic Ouest-France
Bretagne Classic Ouest-France
Bretagne Classic Ouest-France
2022